Mount Bruce is a prominent mountain,  high, rising just south of Stuhlinger Ice Piedmont and between Gannutz Glacier and Barber Glacier in the Bowers Mountains, a major mountain range situated in Victoria Land, Antarctica. The topographical feature was discovered by members of the British Antarctic Expedition, 1910–13, who explored along this coast in the Terra Nova in February 1911, and named for Lieutenant Wilfred M. Bruce, Royal Navy Reserve, officer in charge of zoological work aboard the Terra Nova. The mountain lies situated on the Pennell Coast, a portion of Antarctica lying between Cape Williams and Cape Adare.

References
 

Mountains of Victoria Land
Pennell Coast